Body Snatchers is a studio album released on August 1, 1996 by the Washington, D.C.-based go-go band Rare Essence. The album peaked at No. 60 Billboard's Top R&B/Hip-Hop Albums on September 28, 1996.

Track listing

Studio Side
"Welcome to the Show" – 5:50
"Body Snatchers" – 6:03
"Somebody's Been Funkin with R.E." – 5:19
"One Two" – 6:45
"No Bang No More" – 5:22

Live Side
"If You Feel it's Real" – 7:12
"Call My Name" – 6:16
"All da Time" – 7:12
"Body Snatchers" – 7:48
"Go Down Baby" – 7:19

Personnel
 Charles "Shorty Corleone" Garris – vocals
 Andre "Whiteboy" Johnson – electric guitar, vocals
 Michael "Funky Ned" Neal – bass guitar
 Donnell Floyd – vocals, saxophone
 Kent Wood – keyboards
 Milton "Go-Go Mickey" Freeman – congas, percussion

References

External links
Body Snatchers at Discogs

1996 albums
Rare Essence albums